Zhang Xing (born June 13, 1986) is the left wing position in the 2008 Beijing Olympic Games handball sport. He did not win a medal, nor did the team make it into the finals.

References

External links
Zhang Xing's homepage at Sina.com

Olympic handball players of China
Chinese male handball players
Handball players at the 2008 Summer Olympics
Living people
1986 births
Sportspeople from Huai'an